Carpoglyphus is a mite genus in the family Carpoglyphidae. The species Carpoglyphus passularum (a fruit mite) is responsible for a cutaneous condition called grocer's itch.

References

External links 

Sarcoptiformes